Arnoltice is a municipality and village in Děčín District in the Ústí nad Labem Region of the Czech Republic. It has about 400 inhabitants.

References

External links

Villages in Děčín District
Bohemian Switzerland